György Gruber (born 11 July 1954) is a Hungarian sports shooter. He competed in the mixed trap event at the 1976 Summer Olympics.

References

External links
 

1954 births
Living people
Hungarian male sport shooters
Olympic shooters of Hungary
Shooters at the 1976 Summer Olympics
People from Veszprém
Sportspeople from Veszprém County
20th-century Hungarian people